is a traditional sweet made in Okinawa since the times of the Ryukyu Kingdom, and often sold as a souvenir (Miyagegashi). It is a small biscuit made of mostly lard and flour, with a mild and sweet flavor similar to shortbread.

Origin
The precise origin of Chinsuko is unclear, but multiple baked confections of the time are seen as possible candidates of inspiration. Taosu (桃酥) is a flour-based Chinese traditional cookie that is very similar to Chinsuko. Castella, a  sponge cake variant brought over by Portuguese merchants which was adopted into both Chinese and Japanese cuisine is another contender. Spanish Polvorón has much in common with Chinsuko in terms of texture as well as ingredients. Another theory has Chinsuko as the result of attempts to replicate Portuguese bolo as brought over by the Silk Road using materials available in Okinawa.

References

Shuri-Naha Dialect Dictionary at University of the Ryukyus

Japanese desserts and sweets
Okinawan cuisine
Culture articles needing translation from Japanese Wikipedia